Sigismondo Saraceno (died 7 January 1585) was a Roman Catholic prelate who served as Archbishop of Acerenza e Matera (1556–1585).

Biography
On 4 May 1556, Sigismondo Saraceno was appointed during the papacy of Pope Paul IV as Archbishop of Acerenza e Matera. On 14 Sep 1556, he was consecrated bishop by Giovanni Michele Saraceni, Cardinal-Priest of Santa Maria in Ara Coeli, with Giovanni Beraldo, Bishop of Telese o Cerreto Sannita, and Nicola Majorano (Maggiorani), Bishop of Molfetta, serving as co-consecrators. He served as Archbishop of Acerenza e Matera until his death on 7 January 1585.

References

External links and additional sources
 (for Chronology of Bishops) 
 (for Chronology of Bishops 

16th-century Roman Catholic archbishops in the Kingdom of Naples
Bishops appointed by Pope Paul IV
1585 deaths